Triplophysa parvus is a species of ray-finned fish in the genus Triplophysa.

References

P
Fish described in 2009